Without Mercy is a 1925 American silent melodrama film directed by George Melford and starring Dorothy Phillips and Vera Reynolds. It was distributed by Producers Distributing Corporation.

Plot
As described in a film magazine reviews, Sir Melmoth Craven, British political leader, seeks to borrow a huge amount of money to defray the expense of his election to Parliament. He is turned down by Garth and Garth, Ltd., and obtains the money from Madame Gordon, an underworld moneylender, at usurious rates. Mrs. Enid Garth, head of the former house, learns of the deal. Trouble arises when Sir Melmoth and Margaret Garth, daughter of the woman, become involved in each other. John Orme, Margaret's fiancé and also a Member of Parliament, becomes disgruntled. Mrs. Garth enters the scene and orders Melmoth to leave. When she learns of her daughter's infatuation with Melmoth, she proves to Margaret that Melmoth is a beast by showing her shoulders, which bear the scars made by Melmoth twenty years earlier. John and Melmoth become political opponents in the election. Melmoth wins and then accuses his opponent of fraud, and John is put in jail. Melmoth expects to win Margaret, but at this time he is asked to pay back his loan. He kidnaps Margaret and places her on a barge with dynamite. John gets out of jail in time to swim to the barge where he rescues Margaret just in time to save her from being blown into atoms. Melmoth is apprehended and convicted of his crimes.

Cast

Preservation status
A print of Without Mercy is held at the UCLA Film and Television Archive.

References

External links

1925 films
American silent feature films
Films directed by George Melford
Producers Distributing Corporation films
American black-and-white films
Melodrama films
1925 drama films
Silent American drama films
1920s American films